Romeo and Juliet, Op. 64, is a ballet by Sergei Prokofiev based on William Shakespeare's play Romeo and Juliet. First composed in 1935, it was substantially revised for its Soviet premiere in early 1940. Prokofiev made from the ballet three orchestral suites and a suite for solo piano.

Background and premiere
Based on a synopsis created by Adrian Piotrovsky (who first suggested the subject to Prokofiev) and Sergey Radlov, the ballet was composed by Prokofiev in September 1935 to their scenario which followed the precepts of "drambalet" (dramatised ballet, officially promoted at the Kirov Ballet to replace works based primarily on choreographic display and innovation). Following Radlov's acrimonious resignation from the Kirov in June 1934, a new agreement was signed with the Bolshoi Theatre in Moscow on the understanding that Piotrovsky would remain involved.

However, the ballet's original happy ending (contrary to Shakespeare) provoked controversy among Soviet cultural officials. The ballet's production was then postponed indefinitely when the staff of the Bolshoi was overhauled at the behest of the chairman of the Committee on Arts Affairs, Platon Kerzhentsev. The ballet's failure to be produced in the Soviet Union until 1940 may also have been a result of consequences in the performing arts following Pravda's denunciation of Dmitri Shostakovich in 1936, as well as other "degenerate modernists" including Piotrovsky. The conductor Yuri Fayer met with Prokofiev frequently during the writing of the music, and he strongly urged the composer to revert to the traditional ending. Fayer went on to conduct the first performance of the ballet at the Bolshoi Theatre.

Suites of the ballet music were heard in Moscow and the United States, but the full ballet premiered in the Mahen Theatre, Brno (then in Czechoslovakia, now in the Czech Republic), on 30 December 1938. This version was a single-act production with music mainly from the first two suites. Prokofiev was not able to attend the premiere due to his status of outbound restriction.

The history of the creation of the ballet was recited by the composer Sergei Prokofiev himself:

1940 Kirov production 

It is better known today from the significantly revised version that was first presented at the Kirov Theatre (now Mariinsky Theatre) in Leningrad (now Saint Petersburg) on 11 January 1940, with choreography by Leonid Lavrovsky and with Galina Ulanova and Konstantin Sergeyev in the leading roles. Despite the objections of Prokofiev, Lavrovsky significantly changed the score of the ballet. This production received international acclaim and was awarded the Stalin Prize.

In 1955, Mosfilm made the film version of this production with Galina Ulanova as Juliet and Yuri Zhdanov as Romeo. This film won the Best Lyrical Film and nominated as Palme d'Or in the 1955 Cannes Film Festival.

Original Cast
 Galina Ulanova, Juliet
 Konstantin Sergeyev, Romeo
 Robert Gerbek, Tybalt
 Andrei Lopukhov, Mercutio

Revivals and other productions

In 1955, Frederick Ashton choreographed a production of Romeo and Juliet for the Royal Danish Ballet.

In 1962, John Cranko's choreography of Romeo and Juliet for the Stuttgart Ballet helped the company achieve a worldwide reputation. It had its American premiere in 1969.

In 1965, choreographer Sir Kenneth MacMillan's version for the Royal Ballet premiered at the Royal Opera House, Covent Garden. Margot Fonteyn and Rudolf Nureyev danced the title roles. Fonteyn, considered to be near retirement, embarked upon a rejuvenated career with a partnership with Nureyev. Also in 1965, Oleg Vinogradov stages a version in Russia while serving as assistant ballet master to Pyotr Gusev.

In 1971, John Neumeier, partly inspired by John Cranko, created another version of the ballet in Frankfurt. In 1974, Neumeier's Romeo and Juliet premiered in Hamburg as his first full-length ballet with the company.

In 1977, Rudolf Nureyev created a new version of Romeo and Juliet for the London Festival Ballet, today's English National Ballet. He performed the lead role of Romeo with British ballerinas Eva Evdokimova and Patricia Ruanne creating the role of Juliet.  As a partnership, they toured the production internationally. Eva Evdokimova danced the leading role Juliet in London and Paris, and it continues to be a popular ballet in the ENB repertoire, with its most recent revival in 2010 staged by Patricia Ruanne and Frederic Jahn of the original 1977 cast. This production was also staged by La Scala Theater Ballet in 1980 and Paris Opera Ballet in 1984 and has been a renowned performance in the POB repertoire.

In 1979, Yuri Grigorovich created a new version for the Bolshoi, "which did away with most of the stage properties and stylized the action into an all-danced text." This was revived in 2010 and remains in the Bolshoi repertory.

In 1985, choreographer László Seregi's production premiered at the Hungarian National Ballet, Budapest.

In 1990, director Armondo Linus Acosta used Prokofiev's score, performed by the London Symphony Orchestra, to create a motion picture adaptation of Shakespeare's Romeo and Juliet. Acosta's Romeo.Juliet was conceived as a film-in-concert with a live orchestra performing the soundtrack, and was performed as such to international acclaim with by conductors such as André Previn, Barry Wordsworth, and Nicholas Cleobury. 

In 1991, Christopher Gable directed his own production for the Northern Ballet Theatre. It was choreographed by Massimo Moricone and featured William Walker as Romeo and Jayne Regan as Juliet.

In 1996, choreographer Jean-Christophe Maillot premiered his version of Roméo et Juliette at Les Ballets de Monte Carlo. Taking formal inspiration from the episodic character of Sergei Prokofiev’s classic score, Maillot structured the action in a manner akin to cinematic narrative. Rather than focusing on themes of political-social opposition between the two feuding clans, this Romeo and Juliet highlights the dualities and ambiguities of adolescence.

In 2007, Peter Martins made Romeo + Juliet on New York City Ballet to the Prokofiev music.

In 2008, Krzysztof Pastor presented his version by the Scottish Ballet at the Edinburgh Festival Theatre. The Polish premiere of this version was by the Polish National Ballet in Warsaw, and the United States premiere was by the Joffrey Ballet in 2014.

On July 4, 2008, with the approval of the Prokofiev family and permission from the Russian State Archive, the original Prokofiev score was given its world premiere. Musicologist Simon Morrison, author of The People's Artist: Prokofiev's Soviet Years, unearthed the original materials in the Moscow archives, obtained permissions, and reconstructed the entire score. Mark Morris created the choreography for the production. The Mark Morris Dance Group premiered the work at the Fisher Center for the Performing Arts at Bard College in New York state. The production subsequently began a year-long tour to include Berkeley, Norfolk, London, New York, and Chicago.

In 2011, the National Ballet of Canada premiered a new choreography of Romeo and Juliet by Alexei Ratmansky in Toronto, with plans to take it on tour in Western Canada in early 2012.

Also in 2011, Graeme Murphy created his version of Romeo and Juliet for The Australian Ballet.

In 2015, Stanton Welch premiered his version of Romeo and Juliet for Houston Ballet.

Score

Instrumentation
In addition to a somewhat standard instrumentation, the ballet also requires the use of the tenor saxophone.  This voice adds a unique sound to the orchestra as it is used both in solo and as part of the ensemble.  Prokofiev also used the cornet, viola d'amore and mandolins in the ballet, adding an Italianate flavor to the music.

Full instrumentation is as follows:

Woodwinds
1 piccolo
2 flutes
2 oboes 
1 cor anglais
2 clarinets (2nd doubling on E-flat clarinet)
1 bass clarinet
1 tenor saxophone
2 bassoons
1 contrabassoon

Brass
6 horns
3 trumpets
1 cornet
3 trombones
1 tuba

Percussion
Timpani

Snare drum
Xylophone
Triangle
Woodblock
Maracas
Glockenspiel
Tambourine
Chime in A
Cymbals
Bass drum

Keyboards
Piano
Celesta
Organ

Plucked strings
2 mandolins
2 harps

Bowed strings
Viola d'amore (or solo viola)
First and second violins
Violas
Violoncellos
Double basses

The score is published by Muzyka and the Russian State Publisher.

Structure
List of acts, scenes and musical numbers.

Orchestral suites taken from the work
Note that for compositional reasons the titles of the numbers in all three suites do not always correspond exactly to those in the complete ballet.

Suite No. 1 from Romeo and Juliet, Op. 64bis 

 Folk Dance
 Scene (the Street Awakens)
 Madrigal
 Minuet (the Arrival of the Guests)
 Masks
 Romeo and Juliet (Balcony Scene and Love Dance)
 Death of Tybalt (Containing parts from No. 33, 6, 35 & 36 from the complete score)

Suite No. 2 from Romeo and Juliet, Op. 64ter

 Montagues and Capulets (The Prince Gives His Order and Dance of the Knights)
 Juliet as a Young Girl
 Friar Laurence (Romeo at Friar Laurence's)
 Dance (Dance of the Five Couples)
 Romeo and Juliet Before Parting
 Dance of the Girls with Lilies
 Romeo at Juliet's Tomb (Juliet's Grave)

Suite No. 3 from Romeo and Juliet, Op. 101

 Romeo at the Fountain (Introduction & Romeo)
 Morning Dance
 Juliet (Juliet's Variation & Juliet at Friar Laurence's)
 The Nurse (Preparing for the Ball & The Nurse)
 Aubade (Morning serenade)
 The Death of Juliet

Ten Pieces for Piano, Op. 75
Prokofiev reduced selected music from the ballet as Romeo and Juliet: Ten Pieces for Piano, Op. 75, which were performed in 1936 and 1937.

 Folk Dance
 Scene: The Street Awakens
 Minuet: Arrival of the Guests
 Juliet as a Young Girl
 Masquers
 Montagues and Capulets
 Friar Laurence
 Mercutio
 Dance of the Girls with Lilies
 Romeo and Juliet before Parting

Recordings
Sergei Prokofiev himself made the first recording of music from the ballet, with the Moscow Philharmonic Orchestra in 1938.  Since then, there have been recordings of the full score, as well as various excerpts such as the orchestral suites the composer prepared. Leopold Stokowski conducted the NBC Symphony Orchestra in a rare stereo recording in 1954. Gennady Rozhdestvensky and the Symphony Orchestra of the Bolshoi Theatre recorded the full score in 1959. André Previn with the London Symphony Orchestra and Lorin Maazel with the Cleveland Orchestra both made recordings of the complete score in 1973. Michael Tilson Thomas conducted the San Francisco Symphony Orchestra in 1995, in selections from the score, both for RCA Victor. Georg Solti conducted the Chicago Symphony Orchestra in a recording coupled with the Classical Symphony. Valery Gergiev made two recordings, with the Kirov Orchestra in 1990 and with the London Symphony Orchestra in 2011.

See also
Montagues and Capulets

Notes

References

Sources

External links

Romeo and Juliet The ballet choreography by Rudolf Nureyev
March 7, 1985 NY Times review by Anna Kisselgoff
Romeo & Juliet, On Motifs of Shakespeare: website on first production using the original Prokofiev score as reconstructed by Simon Morrison
 Romeo and Juliet (Ballet): Free scores at the International Music Score Library Project
 Romeo and Juliet (1st Suite): Free scores at the International Music Score Library Project
 Romeo and Juliet (2nd Suite): Free scores at the International Music Score Library Project
 Listening guide based on the Cleveland Orchestra's recording conducted by Lorin Maazel

Ballets based on Romeo and Juliet
Ballets by Sergei Prokofiev
Suites by Sergei Prokofiev
1938 ballet premieres
1935 compositions
1939 compositions